Bannertown is an unincorporated community in Surry County, North Carolina, United  States, just outside the city of Mount Airy .  The community is centered on the intersection of Business U.S. Highway 52 (S. Main Street) and North Carolina Highway 89 (Westfield Road).  Some of the area, specifically from the center of the community to the Ararat River has been annexed by Mount Airy in recent years.

References

Unincorporated communities in Surry County, North Carolina
Unincorporated communities in North Carolina